Yallamanda Rao Veerapaneni was elected as the Member of the Legislative Assembly for Vinukonda constituency in Andhra Pradesh, India, in 1994 and 1999. They represented the Telugu Desam Party on the second occasion, having been an independent candidate on the first.

References

Andhra Pradesh MLAs  1994–1999
Telugu Desam Party politicians
Andhra Pradesh MLAs 1999–2004
People from Guntur district
Telugu politicians
Year of birth missing
Possibly living people